Zavachug is a rural locality (a village) in Kichmengskoye Rural Settlement, Kichmengsko-Gorodetsky District, Vologda Oblast, Russia. The population was 16 as of 2002.

Geography 
Zavachug is located 26 km northeast of Kichmengsky Gorodok (the district's administrative centre) by road. Sushniki is the nearest rural locality.

References 

Rural localities in Kichmengsko-Gorodetsky District